The Foreign Marriage Act, 1969 is an Act of the Parliament of India enacted on 31 August 1969. The Act was enacted due to the recommendations of the Third Law Commission with the object of streamlining the law relating to recognition of marriages solemnized outside India between Indian citizens, or an Indian citizen and a foreign citizen.

Purpose 
The main purpose of the act was to recognise the marriage of citizens of India outside India.

Judicial Review

Supriyo v. Union of India 
The petition requested the Court to recognise the marriage between any two persons, regardless of gender identity and sexual orientation, and declare the notice and objection provisions as void, by enforcing the fundamental rights guaranteed under Articles 14, 15, 19 and 21 of the Indian Constitution.

In October 2020, Vaibhav Jain and Parag Vijay Mehta filed a petition in Delhi High Court. On 5 July 2021, they were joined by Joydeep Sengupta, Russell Blaine Stephens and Mario Leslie Dpenha. On 6 January 2023, their petitions were transferred to Supreme Court to be heard along with Supriyo v. Union of India (2023). Subsequently, they were joined by Utkarsh Saxena and Ananya Kotia on 15 December 2023 and Akkai Padmashali, Vyjayanti Vasanta Mogli and Umesh P on 20 February 2023. In addition to requesting the recognition of same-sex marriage, these petitioners— Akkai Padmashali, Ananya Kotia, Umesh P, Utkarsh Saxena, and Vyjayanti Vasanta Mogli— challenged the notice and objection provisions of Special Marriage Act of 1954 and Foreign Marriage Act of 1969 which hurt vulnerable minorities.

References 

Marriage law in India
Acts of the Parliament of India 1969
Law of India